The Temple of the Moon (Chinese: 月壇/月坛, Pinyin: Yuètán) is an altar located in Fuchengmen, Xicheng District, in western Beijing, China. The altar was built in 1530 during the Ming Dynasty for use in ritual sacrifice to the Moon by the Emperor of China. 

The altar and the surrounding grounds are within a public park. The altar itself is no longer intact, though the surrounding walls remain.

See also
Temple of Heaven
Temple of Earth
Temple of the Sun

References

Buildings and structures completed in 1530
Religious buildings and structures completed in 1530
Major National Historical and Cultural Sites in Beijing
Taoist temples in Beijing
China